Maurice Evans may refer to:

Maurice Evans (footballer, born 1859) (1859–?), Oswestry Town and Wales international footballer
Maurice Evans (footballer, born 1936) (1936–2000), British football player and manager
Maurice Evans (actor) (1901–1989), British-American actor
Maurice Evans (basketball) (born 1978), American basketball player
Maurice Evans (American football) (born 1988), American football defensive end